The 1977 EuroHockey Club Champions Cup, taking place in London, was the fourth edition of Europe's premier field hockey club competition. It was won by hosts and defending champions Southgate Hockey Club from London.

Standings
  Southgate HC
  Uccle Sport
  CD Terrassa
  Schwarz-Weiss Cologne
  SV Kampong
  Nottingham HC
  Slavia Prague
  Warta Poznań
  Lyon
  HK Suboticanka
  Dynamo Almaty
  Edinburgh HC

See also
European Hockey Federation

References

EuroHockey Club Champions Cup
International field hockey competitions hosted by England
EuroHockey Club Champions Cup
EuroHockey Club Champions Cup
1977 in European sport